Ceballos is a Spanish toponymic surname.  A variant is Cevallos. Notable people with the name include:

Alberto Heredia Ceballos, Spanish footballer
Camilo Ceballos, Colombian footballer
Cedric Ceballos, American basketball player
Dani Ceballos, Spanish footballer
Isabel Ceballos, Colombian swimmer
Jacqueline Ceballos, American feminist
Jose Ceballos, Government Affairs Director for National Air Traffic Controllers Association
Juan Bautista Ceballos, interim president of Mexico
Juan Carlos Ceballos, Spanish footballer
Luis Ceballos y Fernández de Córdoba, Spanish botanist
Matias Gabriel Ceballos, Italian Argentinean footballer
Rodrigo de Ceballos, Spanish composer
Leonor Watling (born Leonor Ceballos Watling), Spanish film actress and singer.

See also
Cevallos (surname)

Spanish-language surnames
Surnames of Spanish origin